Ipeelee Kilabuk (1932–2000) was a territorial level politician from Pangnirtung, Northwest Territories, (now Nunavut) Canada.

Kilabuk was first elected to the Northwest Territories Legislature in the 1975 Northwest Territories general election. He ran for re-election in the 1979 Northwest Territories general election but was defeated by James Arreak. Arreak would last less than a year in office and Kilibuk was returned to a second in a by-election held in September 1980. He would run for office again in the 1983 Northwest Territories general election but would be defeated for the second time by Pauloosie Paniloo. Paniloo and Kilabuk would face each other again in the 1987 Northwest Territories general election. This time Kilabuk would defeat Paniloo to win his third term in office. He would be defeated again at the end of his third term in the 1991 Northwest Territories general election.

Kilabuk died in March 2000 of a heart attack.

References

External links
Ipeelee Kilabuk profile

1932 births
2000 deaths
Members of the Legislative Assembly of the Northwest Territories
People from Pangnirtung
Inuit from the Northwest Territories
Inuit politicians
Inuit from Nunavut